The Splendid Crime is a 1926 American crime drama film directed by William C. deMille and starring Bebe Daniels. Famous Players-Lasky produced and Paramount Pictures distributed.

Plot
As described in a film magazine review, Jenny, a young woman who is the leader of a band of crooks, is put on the straight road by Bob Van Dyke, a young man whose house she was attempting to rob. Later, the young man who caused Jenny to reform her life becomes involved in a shady transaction. The young woman after she learns this takes action and saves him from his indiscretion. The pair eventually fall in love and become honestly successful.

Cast
Bebe Daniels as Jenny
Neil Hamilton as Bob Van Dyke
Anne Cornwall as Beth Van Dyke
Anthony Jowitt as John Norton
Fred Walton as Dugan
Lloyd Corrigan as Kelly
Mickey McBan as The Kid
Josephine Crowell as Mary
Marcelle Corday as Madame Denise

Preservation
With no prints of The Splendid Crime located in any film archives, it is a lost film.

References

External links

Lobby poster

American silent feature films
Lost American films
Films directed by William C. deMille
Films based on short fiction
Paramount Pictures films
American crime drama films
American black-and-white films
1926 crime drama films
1926 lost films
Lost crime drama films
1920s American films
Silent American drama films
1920s English-language films